Bambusa aurinuda is a species of Bambusa bamboo.

Distribution
Bambusa aurinuda is commonly found in the Tonkin vicinity of Vietnam.

Description
Bambusa aurinuda is a Perennial and caespitose plant with rather short rhizomes. Its culms are erect, and allows it to grow up to a height of 800–1100 cm long. Its stem grows up to  40–100 mm in diameter. Its stem is woody. The surface of the leaf blade is leaf-blade surface is considered puberulous and sparsely hairy; It is hairy abaxially.

References

aurinuda
Flora of Vietnam